The Cathedral of the Holy Cross, Geraldton is a Cathedral in Geraldton, Western Australia.

References

State  Register of Heritage Places in the City of Greater Geraldton
Geraldton